Endocervical curettage (ECC) is a procedure in which the mucous membrane of the cervical canal is scraped using a spoon-shaped instrument called a curette. The procedure is used to test for abnormal, precancerous conditions, or cervical cancer.

References

External links 
 Endocervical curettage entry in the public domain NCI Dictionary of Cancer Terms

Gynecological surgery